Blaenhonddan is a community of the Neath Port Talbot county borough, south Wales.

The community has its own community council and comprises some or all of the following areas: Aberdulais, Bryncoch, Cilfrew and Cadoxton.  The community covers the electoral wards of Bryncoch North, Bryncoch South and Cadoxton. The population of the community taken at the 2011 census was 12,151.

References

Communities in Neath Port Talbot